Bettina Kämpf (born 13 May 1967) is a German rower. She competed in the women's coxless pair event at the 1988 Summer Olympics.

References

1967 births
Living people
German female rowers
Olympic rowers of West Germany
Rowers at the 1988 Summer Olympics
Rowers from Frankfurt